Qingyuan Subdistrict is a subdistrict situated within Daxing District, Beijing, China. It is located at the south of Gaomidian Subdistrict, west of Guanyinsi Subdistrict, north of Xingfeng Subdistrict, and east of Huangcun Town. As of 2020, there were a total of 147,810 people residing within the subdistrict.

Its name came from Qingyuan Road on the south of the subdistrict.

History

Administrative divisions 

As of 2021, Qingyuan Subdistrict was divided into 24 communities:

See also 

 List of township-level divisions of Beijing

References 

Daxing District
Subdistricts of Beijing